The women's singles tennis event at the 2022 Pacific Mini Games took place at the American Memorial Park and Pacific Islands Club in Saipan, Northern Mariana Islands from 19 to 25 June 2022.

It was an all Papua New Guinean final which saw the number one seed, Abigail Tere-Apisah, take on her niece and seed two, Violet Apisah. The final result saw Violet defeating Abigail, 6–1, 6–1, to win the gold medal in Women's Singles tennis at the 2022 Pacific Mini Games. In the bronze medal match, Fiji's Saoirse Breen defeated PNG's Patricia Apisah, 6–2, 6–2.

Schedule

Seeds
All seeds per ATP rankings.

Results

Finals

Top-half

Section 1

Section 2

Bottom-half

Section 3

Section 4

References

External links
Official website

2022 Pacific Mini Games
Tennis at the Pacific Games
2022 in women's tennis